The second Afro-Asia Cup was played from 6 June until 10 June 2007, hosted by India. The three ODI and one Twenty20 matches were broadcast live on ESPN, after Nimbus had pulled out from the deal with Asian Cricket Council. The Twenty20 match did not have official status as a Twenty20 international or a regular Twenty20 match.

Asia XI claimed the first title in the competition's history, following a tied series in 2005, with a 3–0 whitewash of the African XI. Asian XI captain Mahela Jayawardene was named player of the tournament for his 217 runs, including a half century and a century, in the three ODIs. This cup Held the Record for highest overall runs scored in a 3-match series with 1892 runs being scored until it is broken by India vs England in January 2017 with an overall total of 2090 runs.

Squads

Players who were originally named in the squad but opted to withdraw from the competition are greyed out.

Only Twenty20
 
This match did not have Twenty20 international or Twenty20 status.

ODI series

1st ODI

2nd ODI

3rd ODI

See also
2005 Afro-Asia Cup

Notes

External links
Cricinfo – Afro-Asian Cup, 2007

Afro-Asia Cup
International cricket competitions in 2007
One Day International cricket competitions